The large razorbelly minnow (Salmostoma bacaila) is one of thirteen species of ray-finned fish in the genus Salmostoma.

References 

 

Salmostoma
Fish described in 1822